Ralph Laidlaw Brand (born 8 December 1936) is a Scottish retired footballer, who played as a striker for Rangers, and latterly, Manchester City, Sunderland, Raith Rovers and Hamilton Academical.

Playing career
Born and raised in Edinburgh, Brand had family connections to Glasgow as his uncle resided in Springburn, was a Rangers supporter and worked in the Govan shipyards. He signed for Rangers in 1952 after impressing manager Bill Struth whilst playing in a schoolboy international against England at Wembley; Struth signed him on a provisional contract in the summer of that year.

Having spent time on loan with juvenile side Slateford Athletic and Junior team Broxburn Athletic, in 1954 he turned professional and made his debut for Rangers on 6 November against Kilmarnock, scoring two goals in a 6–0 win. He missed the next two seasons doing his national service. After his return in December 1957, Scot Symon had become the manager and Brand formed an effective strike partnership with fellow Edinburgh native Jimmy Millar, and scored 14 goals in 28 games over the course of the second half of the season.

Having been joined on the left wing by Davie Wilson, his best season came in 1960–61, in which he played in all of Rangers' 34 league games, scoring 24 goals, and 44 in all competitions. These included five goals in Rangers' run to the final of the Cup Winners Cup, three of which were scored in an 8–0 victory over Borussia Mönchengladbach.

Brand played in four Scottish championship winning sides: 1958–59, 1960–61, 1962–63 and the Treble winning side of 1963–64. He won four League Cup and three Scottish Cup winner's medals, the latter set achieved in consecutive years in which he was a scorer in every final (plus a goal in the Old Firm replay of 1963), the only player to have achieved that feat. He played in a total of seven finals for the club, scoring six goals and never finishing on the losing side. In his time at Rangers he played 317 times and scored 206 goals, and is the club's third top post-war scorer behind Ally McCoist and Derek Johnstone.

He played his last match for Rangers on 23 April 1965 when he scored the only goal in a 1–0 win over Third Lanark in the final League game of the season. Brand was sold to Manchester City in August that year for £30,000. Two years later he moved to Sunderland before returning to Scottish football at Raith Rovers (managed by his friend Jimmy Millar). He retired in 1970, although he would come out of retirement to play a handful of matches for Hamilton Academical in 1971–72.

International
Brand played for Scotland eight times, scoring eight goals, although his international opportunities were limited because Denis Law was the established striker in the side. He also played five times for the Scottish League XI, scoring eight times including four in one match against the Irish League in October 1961.

Managerial career
Brand had a brief managerial career, taking charge of Darlington for 6 months from December 1972, then Albion Rovers between 1973 and 1974. After leaving the football business he worked as a taxi-driver.

Personal life
Brand's son, Ralph Brand Jr., played a number of games for Rangers' reserve team in the 1970s.

International goals 
Scores and results list Scotland's goal tally first.

Honours

As a player 
Rangers
UEFA Cup Winners' CupRunners-up: 1960–61
Scottish League First Division: 1958–59, 1960–61, 1962–63, 1963–64
Scottish Cup: 1961–62, 1962–63, 1963–64
Scottish League Cup: 1960–61, 1961–62, 1963–64, 1964–65

Manchester City
Football League Second Division: 1965–66

References

External links

International stats at Londonhearts.com

1936 births
Living people
Footballers from Edinburgh
Scottish footballers
Association football forwards
Rangers F.C. players
Manchester City F.C. players
Sunderland A.F.C. players
Raith Rovers F.C. players
Hamilton Academical F.C. players
Scottish Football League players
English Football League players
Scottish football managers
Darlington F.C. managers
Albion Rovers F.C. managers
English Football League managers
Scottish Football League managers
Scotland international footballers
Scottish Football League representative players
Scotland under-23 international footballers
Broxburn Athletic F.C. players
Scottish Junior Football Association players
British taxi drivers